Fritz Kopperschmidt (22 December 1939 – 16 February 2011) was a German sailor who competed in the 1964 Summer Olympics and in the 1968 Summer Olympics. He was born in Hamburg.

References

1939 births
2011 deaths
German male sailors (sport)
Olympic sailors of the United Team of Germany
Olympic sailors of West Germany
Sailors at the 1964 Summer Olympics – 5.5 Metre
Sailors at the 1968 Summer Olympics – Star
Sportspeople from Hamburg